Akchi, also spelled Akchiy, is a populated place in Kazakhstan. It has a small population and is in Pavlodar Region. Relatively nearby towns include Akhmet,  Kyzyltas, Uzynbulak and Uzynbulaq. Astana, Karaganda, Pavlodar, Semey and Omsk are the closest big cities. Akchi is located north of Lake Balkhash.

Akchi was the site of mercury and arsenic testing, along with Aralsk.

References

Populated places in Pavlodar Region